Between the Folds is a 2008 film documentary about origami. Directed by Vanessa Gould and broadcast on Independent Lens, the film received a 2010 Peabody Award.

Notable origami artists featured in the film include Erik and Martin Demaine, Tom Hull, Éric Joisel, Satoshi Kamiya, Robert J. Lang, and (using archival footage) Akira Yoshizawa.

Home media
Between the Folds has been released as a region 1 DVD.

See also
Obit is a 2016 documentary written and directed by Vanessa Gould.

References

External links
 
 

2008 films
2008 documentary films
PBS original programming
Documentary films about the visual arts
Origami
Peabody Award-winning television programs
American documentary films
2000s English-language films
2000s American films